Awaz - Dil Se Dil Tak is an Indian television series which aired on Zee TV channel. A Mumbai-London flight gets hijacked and a tussle ensues between the passengers and the hijackers resulting in a plane crash. It was aired from Sunday to Wednesday at 10:00 PM.
The show began from 10 August 2003 and ended by 2 March 2004.

Overview
The opening episodes introduce the various characters of the serial and simultaneously unfold the conspiracy of a plane hijack. The plot builds up with focus on the ill-fated A.P.-106 Mumbai to London flight.

The hijackers board the plane but are unable to take charge of the flight. In an ensuing fight between the hijackers and the crew members the plane crashes.

Search operation for the debris of the aircraft is ordered, but nothing is found. The world is shocked by the news of the tragedy.

The story takes an unexpected turn when 18 people out of 426 passengers survive but are marooned on an island. These 18 people have nothing in common except that they were together on the ill-fated flight. Each one tries to survive on his/her own but gradually realizes that their survival depends on their unity and collective spirit. A bond starts building amongst them and slowly they come to terms with the reality.

Meanwhile, the families of the victims are mourning the loss of their loved ones. Some are going through denial while others are trying to cope with the loss.

As time passes the passengers start believing that they are stranded on this island for the rest of their lives. But destiny has something   else in store for them. They are rescued and are reunited with their families. The exhilaration of returning to their homes is combined with the pain of shattering relationships.

Cast
 Rohini Hattangadi
 Amit Sadh as Bhaskar Gupta
 Moonmoon Banerjee as Ritika Bhaskar Gupta
 Amit Behl
 Ram Kapoor as ACP Vishal Kapoor / DCP Vishal Kapoor
 Varun Badola as Aman
 Govind Namdev as Bhai Ji
 Sudhir Pandey as Harjeet Singh
 Yash Sinha as Vinay (Vinu) Tiwari
 Manasi Salvi as Sargam Vinay Tiwari
 Amardeep Jha as Harjeet Singh's Wife
 Aamir Dalvi as Karan
 Ritu Chaudhary as Ritika Bhaskar Gupta
 Alka Kaushal
 Savita Prabhune as Mrs. Gupta (Pramod and Bhaskar's Mother) 
 Gautam Chaturvedi as Pramod Gupta
 Lata Sabharwal as Lata Pramod Gupta
 Nagesh Salwan
 Naresh Suri as Mr. Gupta (Pramod and Bhaskar's Father)
 Benika Bisht
 Uday Tikekar as Police Commissioner Raj Desai
 Meenakshi Verma as Mrs. Desai
 Dimple Inamdar as Sargam
 Sai Ballal as Tanya's Father
 Shama Deshpande as Tanya's Mother
 Navni Parihar
 Pooja Gandhi as Tanya
 Zoya Chaudhary
 Vineet Kumar
 Barkha Madan
 Rahul Lohani as Nisaar Ahmed
 Indu Verma as Esha Vishal Kapoor
 Nisaar Khan

References

External links 
AWAAZ DIL SE DIL TAK on Zee Cafe UK

2003 Indian television series debuts
Zee TV original programming
Indian television soap operas
2004 Indian television series endings